Marko Stanojević (Serbian Cyrillic: Марко Станојевић; born 22 June 1988) is a Serbian association footballer who plays as a midfielder for Nasaf.

Career
Stanojević has played for Red Star in Serbia, and FK Laktaši in the First League of Republika Srpska. During the 2011–12 UEFA Europa League qualifying phase and play-off round, Stanojević scored a brace in the first leg against San Marino team Tre Penne in which FK Rad won 6–0. He scored his third goal of the competition, in the second leg, in which Rad won 3–1, taking their aggregate score to 9–1.

On 8 August 2014, Stanojević signed on a one-year loan deal with Simurq.

On 25 December 2017, FC Astana announced the signing of Stanojević. On 23 July 2018, Astana announced that Stanojević had left the club.
On 1 September 2018, Levadiakos F.C. announced the signing of the Serbian winger till the summer of 2020 for an undisclosed fee.

On 9 July 2019, Stanojević returned to the Kazakhstan Premier League, signing for FC Irtysh Pavlodar.

Career statistics

Honours
Sheriff Tiraspol
Moldovan National Division: 2012–13, 2013–14
Moldovan Super Cup: 2013

Notes

References

External links
 
 Marko Stanojević Stats at Utakmica.rs
 

Living people
1988 births
Serbian footballers
Serbian expatriate footballers
Serbian SuperLiga players
Azerbaijan Premier League players
Moldovan Super Liga players
FK Rad players
Al-Fateh SC players
FC Sheriff Tiraspol players
Levadiakos F.C. players
FC Nasaf players
Association football midfielders
Expatriate footballers in Moldova
Expatriate footballers in Azerbaijan
Expatriate footballers in Kazakhstan
Expatriate footballers in Greece
Expatriate footballers in Uzbekistan
Saudi Professional League players
People from Pirot